Hopewell High School is a public high school in Hopewell Township, Pennsylvania, United States. It is the only high school in the Hopewell Area School District. Athletic teams compete as the Hopewell Vikings in the Western Pennsylvania Interscholastic Athletic League.

Extracurriculars
Hopewell High School offers a wide variety of clubs, activities and sports.

Sports
Viking teams have held the following Pennsylvania Interscholastic Athletic Association championships: baseball, 1986, 2021; football, 2002; girls volleyball, 2004; girls basketball, 2006, 2007.  Hopewell's girls volleyball team is a four-time defending champion in the Western Pennsylvania Interscholastic Athletic League.

Notable alumni
Daniel Chamovitz, noted biologist and author of What a Plant Knows, President of Ben Gurion University of the Negev
Tony Dorsett, second overall pick in the 1977 NFL Draft, former Heisman Trophy winner at Pittsburgh, Pro Football Hall of Fame and College Football Hall of Fame, former NFL Player for the Dallas Cowboys and Denver Broncos.
April Goss, former placekicker for the Kent State Golden Flashes football team, became the second female player to score in an official Football Bowl Subdivision game.
Nate Guenin played for 5 NHL teams in his career.
Christa Harmotto, Penn State volleyball player, 2007 Big Ten Player of the Year, led team to 2007 NCAA volleyball championship, also broke Hopewell High School's record for hitting percentage and blocks.
Bill Koman, former NFL linebacker for the Baltimore Colts, Philadelphia Eagles and St. Louis Cardinals.
Doc Medich, former professional baseball player who pitched in the Major Leagues from 1972 to 1982 for five different teams. 
Paul Posluszny, former NFL linebacker,  two time Bednarik Award winner, and 2005 Butkus Award winner.
Dan Rains, former player of the Chicago Bears.
Joe Rock (baseball), pitcher in the Colorado Rockies organization.
Joe Verbanic, former Major League Baseball pitcher for Philadelphia Phillies and New York Yankees.
Rushel Shell, WPIAL career rushing yardage leader.

References

External links 
 Hopewell High School
 Hopewell High School Library
 Hopewell High School Athletics
 Hopewell Viking Musicals
 Hopewell Viking Pride Marching Band

Public high schools in Pennsylvania
Education in Pittsburgh area
Schools in Beaver County, Pennsylvania